Paola Ramos (born 1987) is an American journalist. Ramos is a correspondent for Vice and is a contributor to Telemundo and MSNBC. Ramos' work focuses primarily around Latino issues. Ramos has been featured, and has served as a subject matter expert, in Latina, Popsugar, Bustle, Vice, Los Angeles Blade, South Kern Sol, HIV Plus Magazine, and on KCRW.

Early life and education
Paola Ramos was born in 1987 in Miami, Florida. She grew up in Spain. Her mother, Gina Montaner, was born in Cuba and her father is Mexican journalist Jorge Ramos. Ramos graduated from Barnard College with a BA in Political Science and Government in 2009 and earned her Master in Public Policy from the Harvard Kennedy School in 2015.

Career

Ramos served in the Obama administration, including working for both President Barack Obama and Vice President Joe Biden, and served as Deputy Director of Hispanic Media for the Hillary Clinton 2016 presidential campaign. In 2019, Ramos became a correspondent for Vice's documentary series, Vice, and Vice News Tonight. She is the prior host to Vice'''s docuseries Latin-X. For her work at Vice, she was nominated for a GLAAD Media Award for her piece "The Latinx Drag Queens Spearheading HIV Activism on the Border". That same year, Ramos keynoted George Washington University's LatinX Heritage Celebration. She currently serves as an on-air contributor to Telemundo and MSNBC and also serves as speaker for Lesbians Who Tech + Allies.

References

Further reading
Lavariega Monforti, Jessica L. Latinos in the American Political System: An Encyclopedia of Latinos as Voters, Candidates, and Office Holders.'' Santa Barbara: ABC-CLIO (2019). pp. 424

External links

1987 births
Living people
21st-century American journalists
Vice Media
MSNBC people
Telemundo
American women journalists
People from Miami
American people of Cuban descent
American people of Mexican descent
Barnard College alumni
Harvard University alumni
Obama administration personnel
Hillary Clinton 2016 presidential campaign
American LGBT journalists
American LGBT broadcasters
LGBT people from Florida
LGBT Hispanic and Latino American people
Journalists from Florida
Hispanic and Latino American people in television